Phillips may refer to:

Businesses

Energy 
 Chevron Phillips Chemical, American petrochemical firm jointly owned by Chevron Corporation and Phillips 66.
 ConocoPhillips, American energy company
 Phillips 66, American energy company
 Phillips Petroleum Company, American oil company

Service 
 Phillips (auctioneers), auction house
 Phillips Distilling Company, Minnesota distillery
 Phillips Foods, Inc. and Seafood Restaurants, seafood chain in the mid-Atlantic states
 Phillips International Records, a record label founded by Sam Phillips

Vehicle 
 Phillips (constructor), American constructor of racing cars
 Phillips Cycles, British manufacturer of bicycles and mopeds

People

Surname
Philip Phillips (disambiguation)
Phillips (surname)

Given name
 Phillips Barry (1880–1937), American academic
 Phillips Brooks (1835–1893), American clergyman and author
 Phillips Callbeck (1744–1790), merchant and political figure in St. John's Island, Canada
 Phillips Carlin (1894–1971), American radio broadcaster and television executive
 Phillips Cosby (1729–1808), Royal Navy officer who fought in the American Revolutionary War
 Phillips Gybbon (1678–1762), English MP
 Phillips Holmes (1907–1942), American film actor
 Phillips Idowu (born 1978), British athlete
 Phillips Lee Goldsborough (1865–1946), American politician from Maryland
 Phillips Lord (1902–1975), American actor and writer
 Phillips Payson (1704–1778), American minister
 Phillips Smalley (1865–1939), American silent film director and actor
 Phillips Talbot (1915–2010), U.S. ambassador to Greece
 Phillips Tead (1893–1974), American actor
 Phillips Waller Smith (1906–1963), Major General in the United States Air Force
 Phillips White (1729–1811), American farmer and member of the Continental Congress

Places

Canada
 Phillips Square, public square in Montreal, Quebec

United States
 Phillips, California
 Phillips, Maine
 Phillips, Minneapolis, Minnesota
 Phillips, Nebraska
 Phillips, Oklahoma
 Phillips, Texas
 Phillips, Wisconsin
 Phillips Township, White County, Illinois
 The Phillips Collection, an art museum in Washington, D.C.

Outer space
 Phillips (lunar crater)
 Phillips (Martian crater)

Science and technology
 Phillips screwdriver
 Phillips curve, an economic curve
 Phillips relationship, in astrophysics

Schools
 Phillips Academy, a boarding secondary school in Andover, Massachusetts
 Phillips Exeter Academy, a boarding secondary school in Exeter, New Hampshire
 Phillips High School (North Carolina), Raleigh, North Carolina
 Phillips Theological Seminary, Tulsa, Oklahoma
 Phillips University, Oklahoma

Other uses
 Phillips disaster of 1989, a series of explosions and fires in the Houston Ship Channel
 USS Phillips (SP-1389), US Navy patrol boat during World War I

See also
 Phillips County (disambiguation)
 Philipps (disambiguation)
 Philips (disambiguation)
 Phillipps
 Philips
 Philip (disambiguation)